Susan Joy Alexander is an Australian former professional tennis player.

Raised in Sydney, Australia, Alexander is an elder sister of tennis player John Alexander and began competing on tour during the 1960s. She featured in the singles second round at Wimbledon on three occasions and made the mixed doubles round of 16 with her brother in 1967. Her best Australian Open performance came in 1970 when she made the third round of the singles and was a quarter-finalist in women's doubles.

References

External links
 
 

Year of birth missing (living people)
Living people
Australian female tennis players
Tennis players from Sydney
20th-century Australian women